Okrouhlice is a municipality and village in Havlíčkův Brod District in the Vysočina Region of the Czech Republic. It has about 1,400 inhabitants.

Administrative parts
Villages of Babice, Chlístov, Olešnice and Vadín are administrative parts of Okrouhlice.

Notable people
Jan Zrzavý (1890–1977), painter

References

Villages in Havlíčkův Brod District